Stokley may refer to:

 Stokley, Missouri, an unincorporated community

People with the given name
 Stokley Williams (born 1967), American musician

People with the surname
 Brandon Stokley (born 1976), American football player
 Jimmy Stokley, member of the American band Exile
 Nelson Stokley (1944–2010), American football player and coach
 William S. Stokley (1823–1902), American politician

See also
 Stockley (disambiguation)
 Stokely
 Stokeley, a 2018 album by Ski Mask the Slump God